1,4-Dimethoxybenzene is an organic compound with the formula CH(OCH).  It is one of three isomers of dimethoxybenzene.  It is a white solid with an intensely sweet floral odor.  It is produced by several plant species.

Occurrence
It occurs naturally in willow (Salix), tea, hyacinth, zucchini (Cucurbita pepo).  It appears to attract bees as it has a powerful response in their antenna. In a study in mice, Iranian scientists identified 1,4-dimethoxybenzene as the major psychoactive chemical in musk willow (Salix aegyptiaca) by its ability to cause somnolescence and depressed activity.

Preparation
It is produced by the methylation of hydroquinone using dimethylsulfate and an alkali.

Uses
1,4-Dimethoxybenzene is mainly used in perfumes and soaps.

It is an intermediate in synthesis of organic compounds, including pharmaceuticals such as methoxamine and butaxamine.

Niche uses
It can be used as a developer in black and white film, and as a base in synthesizing catecholamines and phenethylamines.

References

Hydroquinone ethers
O-methylated natural phenols
Sweet-smelling chemicals